The Clopodia is a left tributary of the river Moravița in Romania. It discharges into the Moravița near Percosova.

References

Rivers of Romania
Rivers of Timiș County